Kim Daul (Hangul: 김다울 May 31, 1989 – November 19, 2009) was a South Korean model, painter and regular blogger. She died by suicide at the age of 20.

Career
Kim was born in Seoul, South Korea, on 31 May 1989. She was regularly featured in magazines such as British Vogue, i-D and Dazed & Confused. In South Korea, she appeared on the covers of South Korean Vogue in August 2007 and May 2008 and in Harper's Bazaar in July 2008. She made her international catwalk debut at Paris Fashion Week in 2007.

Karl Lagerfeld, Vivienne Westwood, Chanel, Alexander McQueen, and Christopher Kane are among the top designers who consistently used Kim to showcase their latest collections. She also modelled for H & M and GAP. 
In 2008 she was named Model of the Year by Anan magazine.

She also appeared on the South Korean series I am a Model in season 3. In June 2009 she appeared nude in i-D magazine, sparking criticism in Korea. Her career was developing when she moved to Paris, France, in 2009 to model for Next. Shortly before her death she had appeared on the cover for the Australian Russh as well as video advertisements for Topshop, Richard Nicoll and Chanel.

Personal life
Kim was a keen painter and on 10 August 2007 she held a solo exhibition of her artwork in Seoul. She collected antique forks and kept a blog titled "I Like to Fork Myself". She was also a fan of Klaus Kinski and his films and collected works. She had a tattoo of a star on the inside of her left hand.

Death and later impact
Kim was discovered hanged in her 10th arrondissement apartment in Paris on 19 November 2009 at the age of 20. The Paris prosecutor's office found a suicide note at the scene and ruled her death as a suicide. Kim had suffered from loneliness, insomnia and depression and had felt frustrated with the demands of the fashion industry for a long time. She voiced her personal thoughts and issues in her own weblog and also expressed herself through her paintings. She had sometimes dodged calls from her agents because she felt overworked.

As far back as 2007 she had written of angst, self-mutilation and suicide. In April of that year, she posted: "I am going to smash my face... My life as Daul was so miserable and lonely. Please join my loneliness in another world. I love you all. Daul", but later added, "KIDDING. I'm fine. Just tired." She had also admitted that she self-harmed. In October 2009 during New York Fashion Week she left a post on her blog describing herself as "mad depressed and overworked". She became the ninth South Korean celebrity to die by suicide in 2009. Daul's last post included a song titled "I Go Deep" by Jim Rivers. The post was titled "Say Hi to Forever", and underneath she wrote "best track forever". She took her own life shortly after.

See also
Suicide in South Korea

References

External links

Vogue interview
Daul Kim's Blog

1989 births
2009 deaths
People from Seoul
South Korean female models
South Korean bloggers
South Korean women bloggers
Suicides by hanging in France
Models from Seoul
2009 suicides